Lee J. Jussim (born December 2, 1955) is an American social psychologist. He leads the Social Perception Laboratory at Rutgers University.

Early life and education
When Jussim was 5 years old, his family moved into a Brooklyn-area public housing where they lived until he was 12. When he was 13, his family moved to Levittown, Long Island, and his mother died of cancer shortly after.

Jussim dropped out of college shortly before he met Lisa Baum whom he would later marry in 1975.  They have three children together. Jussim enrolled at the University of Massachusetts Boston in 1979, where he majored in psychology. He completed his doctoral degree at the University of Michigan under the supervision of professor Lerita Coleman.  He graduated with a doctorate in social psychology in 1987 and entered a teaching position at Rutgers University that same year.

Career
Jussim runs the Social Perception Lab at Rutgers University, Livingston Campus.  The lab studies how people perceive, think about, and judge others.

References

External links
 Rabble Rouser, Jussim's blog
 

1955 births
Living people
American social psychologists
University of Massachusetts Boston alumni
University of Michigan alumni
Rutgers University faculty
People from Brooklyn
People from Levittown, New York